Gallium(I) oxide, digallium monoxide or gallium suboxide is an inorganic compound with the formula Ga2O.

Production
Gallium(I) oxide can be produced by reacting gallium(III) oxide with heated gallium in vacuum:

It can also be obtained by reacting gallium with carbon dioxide in vacuum at 850 °C.

Gallium(I) oxide is a by-product in the production of gallium arsenide wafers:

Properties
Gallium(I) oxide is a brown-black diamagnetic solid which is resistant to further oxidation in dry air. It starts decomposing upon heating at temperatures above 500 °C, and the decomposition rate depends on the atmosphere (vacuum, inert gas, air).

References

Oxides
Gallium compounds